Kenneth Mburu Mungara, also known as Kennedy Mburu, (born 7 September 1973 in Limuru) is a Kenyan long distance runner who specialises in the marathon. He holds the Master's 40-44 age group world record in the marathon.

He won his first major international marathon in 2008, completing the Prague Marathon in 2:11:06, one minute ahead of second-placed Eliah Sang. Four months later he won the Scotiabank Toronto Waterfront Marathon, upsetting the race favourites John Kelai and Tariku Jufar, and edging out Peter Kiprotich for the victory in 2:11:01.

In January the following year, he won the Mumbai Marathon and his time of 2:11:51 was the fastest ever on Indian soil, beating Shivnath Singh's record which had stood since 1978. He managed a third-place finish at the 2009 Prague Marathon, but he was hampered by a knee injury. He recovered in time for the 2009 Toronto Waterfront Marathon and defended his title, finishing in a time of 2:08:31 and breaking the Canadian all-comers' record. He was pleased with, but surprised by, the achievement, stating that he did not believe his manager when he said Mungara could run 2:08. He received a total of 55,000 Canadian dollars in winner's prize money and performance bonuses.

He returned to the Prague Marathon in 2010 but could not repeat his past performances and finished in 2:10:53 for seventh place. He maintained his reputation at the Scotiabank Toronto Waterfront Marathon, however, improving his Canadian all-comers record to 2:07:57 for his third consecutive win of the event. When asked whether he was considering one of the large American marathons the following year, Mungara admitted he had already promised to return to Toronto for a fourth attempt. He won at the Singapore Marathon in December, taking the first prize of US$50,000. He achieved a fourth straight win at the 2011 Toronto Marathon, although the finish was close between Mungara and Abdullah Dawit as both recorded the same finishing time of 2:09:51 hours. At the 2011 Prague Marathon he was runner-up to Benson Barus but still managed a personal best run of 2:07:36 hours.

He did not perform well in the 2012 season, running 2:15:59 at the Paris Marathon and then 2:16:53 at the JoongAng Seoul Marathon, finishing far behind the winner on both occasions. He was ever slower (2:17:40) at the Singapore Marathon, but was fourth and only twenty seconds behind the leader at that race. Almost a year passed until his next outing, where he returned to form with a winning run of 2:11:40 hours at the Nairobi Marathon.

In July 2015 he raced at the Gold Coast Marathon in Australia for the first time, which is an IAAF Gold Label Race. He placed first finishing in 2:08:42 beating the defending champion Silah Limo by only 12 seconds, which remains the course and Australian All-Comers record. In 2016, Kenneth successfully defended his title by edging out Japanese running legend, Yuki Kawauchi, by a mere one second in one of the closest and thrilling finishes in marathon history. He returned for a third year in 2017 placing second, only to be beaten one hundred meters from the finish line by Japanese runner Takuya Noguchi in another thrilling finish on the Gold Coast. Kenneth returned to the Gold Coast Marathon for the fourth consecutive year in 2018, which he became champion for the third time in yet again one of the closest races in the events history, with only three seconds separating the top three places in the race.

In 2018 Kenneth was selected on the national team to represent Kenya in the marathon at the XXI Commonwealth Games on the Gold Coast in Australia. The marathon event took place on 15 April 2018 at 8:15am (AEST), which was the final day of the Games. He placed in tenth in a time of 2:25:42.

Achievements
All results regarding marathon, unless stated otherwise

Personal bests 

All information taken from IAAF profile.

References

External links



1973 births
Living people
Kenyan male long-distance runners
Kenyan male marathon runners
Athletes (track and field) at the 2018 Commonwealth Games
People from Kiambu County
Commonwealth Games competitors for Kenya
Taipei Marathon male winners